Helena Flats is a census-designated place (CDP) in Flathead County, Montana, United States. The population was 1,043 in the 2010 census.

Demographics

References

Census-designated places in Flathead County, Montana
Census-designated places in Montana